Matihani may refer to:

Matihani, India
Matihani, Nepal
Matihani (Vidhan Sabha constituency), in Begusarai District